Kokkupalem is a small village in Nellore district, Andhra Pradesh state, India.

References

Villages in Nellore district